Proisir (foaled 2009) is an Australian-bred Thoroughbred racehorse who won at Group 3 level at age 3 and has gone on to forge a successful career as a stud stallion in New Zealand.

Racing career

Proisir's racing career included the following:

 1st in the 2012 Spring Stakes (Group 3, 1600m, Newcastle) beating Trophies
 2nd in the 2012 Spring Champion Stakes (Group 1, 2000m) behind It’s a Dundeel with Honorious 3rd
 8th in the 2012 Cox Plate behind Ocean Park
 3rd in the 2013 Hobartville Stakes (Group 2, 1400m) behind Pierro and Rebel Dane with It’s a Dundeel 4th
 2nd in the 2013 Randwick Guineas (Group 1, 1600m) behind It’s a Dundeel with Tatra 3rd

Stud career

Proisir stands at the Rich Hill Stud in the Waikato, New Zealand. He started his career with a relatively low fee of NZ$7,000 and $9,000 in his initial years.

The service fee had risen to $17,500 by the 2023 season as a result of a number of Group race successes by his progeny.

Notable progeny

c = colt, f = filly/mare, g = gelding''

See also
  Thoroughbred racing in New Zealand

References

2009 racehorse births
New Zealand Thoroughbred sires